Þóra Björg Helgadóttir (born 5 May 1981), commonly Anglicised as Thora Helgadottir, is an Icelandic footballer who played as a goalkeeper. Trained at university level in the United States, she formerly played for four seasons with Duke University's women's soccer team. She most recently played for Damallsvenskan club Malmö (FC Rosengård) and had previously represented clubs in Iceland, Belgium, Norway and Australia.

Since making her debut for the Iceland women's national football team in 1998, Þóra has accrued over a century of caps. She was named in Iceland's squad for the 2009 and 2013 editions of the UEFA Women's Championship. Þóra is the younger sister of Ásthildur Helgadóttir, former captain of the women's national team.

In May 2014 Þóra announced via Twitter that she was leaving FC Rosengård and returning to Iceland.

Club career
Þóra made her debut in the domestic Úrvalsdeild league as a 14-year-old. Playing with Breiðablik and later with KR, she went on to win eight league titles and six Icelandic Women's Cups.

From 2000 until 2003 Þóra attended Duke University, where she studied mathematics and history, and played varsity soccer.

Þóra had already spent the 2004 season in Norway as Bente Nordby's understudy at Kolbotn, when in January 2007 the opportunity to move to Belgium came up through her career outside football. In August 2007 she left Anderlecht to join sister Ásthildur in Sweden at Malmö, who needed a goalkeeper due to Caroline Jönsson's anterior cruciate ligament injury.

In 2009 Þóra played for Kolbotn and was named Toppserien Player of the Year. She signed a three-year contract with Malmö in November 2009. Malmö secured their first Damallsvenskan championship since 1994 in the 2010 season.

In the 2012–13 winter season, Þóra played on loan for Western Sydney Wanderers in the Australian W-League.

Þóra was named Damallsvenskan goalkeeper of the year in 2012 and 2013 after keeping 14 "clean sheets" as Malmö recaptured the league title from rivals Tyresö FF. She announced that her final game for Malmö, who became FC Rosengård for 2014, would be against Piteå IF on 2 July 2014. She agreed to join Fylkir of the Úrvalsdeild upon her return to Iceland.

Þóra retired after the season with Fylkir in 2015 and is now assistant manager at Fylkir.

She signed for Stjarnan in 2016.

International career
Five days after turning 17, Þóra made her senior international debut for Iceland in a 1–0 friendly defeat to the United States on 10 May 1998.

At UEFA Women's Euro 2009, Þóra played in two matches as Iceland were eliminated in the first round.

National team coach Siggi Eyjólfsson selected Þóra in the Iceland squad for UEFA Women's Euro 2013, although she was recovering from a hamstring injury. Guðbjörg Gunnarsdóttir took the goalkeeping position at the final tournament, playing in the three group matches and the 4–0 quarter-final defeat to hosts Sweden.

Iceland beat Norway 2–1 at the 2014 Algarve Cup, as Þóra made her 100th national team appearance.

Personal life
Celebrity goldfish Sigurwin, the mascot of the Iceland women's national football team, was released into Þóra's care after UEFA Women's Euro 2013. Sigurwin came to prominence during the tournament when Ludvig Lindström of Global Happiness Organization (GHO) publicly criticised the players for keeping him in a jar and making jokes about flushing him down the toilet.

Honours
Sport person of Kópavogur 2005 and 2006.

References

External links
 
 
 
 
 
 
 

1981 births
Living people
Thora Bjorg Helgadottir
Thora Bjorg Helgadottir
Thora Bjorg Helgadottir
FC Rosengård players
Damallsvenskan players
Expatriate women's soccer players in Australia
Expatriate women's footballers in Belgium
Expatriate women's footballers in Sweden
Expatriate women's footballers in Norway
Thora Bjorg Helgadottir
Duke Blue Devils women's soccer players
Western Sydney Wanderers FC (A-League Women) players
Thora Bjorg Helgadottir
FIFA Century Club
Women's association football goalkeepers
Thora Bjorg Helgadottir
Kolbotn Fotball players
Toppserien players
RSC Anderlecht (women) players
Thora Bjorg Helgadottir
Thora Bjorg Helgadottir
Thora Bjorg Helgadottir
Thora Bjorg Helgadottir
Thora Bjorg Helgadottir
Expatriate women's soccer players in the United States